is the second studio album of the character Kirari Tsukishima from the Japanese anime Kirarin Revolution.

Background and release

Kirarin Land is the second studio album of the character Kirari Tsukishima from Kirarin Revolution. Aside from containing new original songs, the album compiles songs from her previous singles, "Happy" and "Chance!", as well as "Hana o Pūn" and "Futari wa NS", her duets with Mai Hagiwara from Cute under the name Kira Pika. "Olala", the ending theme song from January 2008 to March 2008 for Kirarin Revolution, was used as Kirarin Land'''s promotional track.

The album was released on December 19, 2007 under the Zetima label. The limited edition featured an alternate cover, DVD exclusives, and a Happy Idol Life Kurikira Card from Kirarin Revolution. The regular edition came with a large sticker as its first press bonus.

Reception

The album debuted at #17 in the Oricon Weekly Albums Chart and charted for 7 weeks.

Editors at Barks reviewed the album favorably, noting that it was "rich in variety" and comparing some of the songs to French pop music. Kirarin Land was called an album that "not only Morning Musume fans can enjoy, but also children, the target demographic of Kirarin Revolution", citing the album-original song "Konnichipa" as an example of clever uses of word play. In contrast, Kira Pika's ballad "Futari wa NS" was also highlighted as an album favorite, with Barks insisting that the album is a good opportunity to listen to the song for fans who missed the single release. Barks'' also praised the art direction of the album, claiming that it was "worth buying just to see [Kusumi's] photos in the lyrics booklet."

Track listing

Charts

References

2007 albums
Anime soundtracks
Kirarin Revolution
Hello! Project albums
Television soundtracks